Pavel is a Croatian rock band composed of eight members: Aljoša Šerić, Antonia Matković, Jurica Hotko, Toni Tkalec, Mario Radan, Stipe Mađor, Dean Melki and Filip Hrelja. The group signed a joint record deal with Dallas Records, after forming in 2006. Later in 2007, the group released their debut studio album, Pavel.

Band members
Current members
Aljoša Šerić — vocals, acoustic guitar 
Antonia Matković — vocals 
Jurica Hotko — piano 
Toni Tkalec — guitar 
Mario Radan — bass guitar 
Stipe Mađor — trumpet 
Dean Melki — violin 
Filip Hrelja — drums

Discography

Albums
 Pavel (2007)
 Od prve zvijezde ravno (2012)
 I mi smo došli na red (2014)
 Družba krivih odluka (2017)
 Ennui (2020)

Singles

References

External links

Croatian rock music groups
Musical groups established in 2006
2006 establishments in Croatia